Princess Heke of the Second Rank (和碩和恪公主; 17 August 1758 – 14 December 1780), was a Chinese princess of the Qing dynasty. She was the ninth daughter of Qianlong Emperor with Empress Xiaoyichun. She was given the title of a second rank princess  in 1772, when she married Jalantai from the Uya clan which was the same clan as her great-grandmother, Empress Xiaogongren, family.

Life 
Princess Heke of the Second Rank was born on 17 August 1758 in the Forbidden City Beijing to  Consort Ling.  Her adoptive mother was Consort Shu of the Yehe Nara clan. It seems that the Qianlong Emperor did not favor Primcess Heke very much, as her dowry upon marrying Jalantai (扎兰泰) of the Uya Clan in 1771 was smaller than that of any of her sisters. And when the Jiaqing Emperor ascended the throne in 1796, promoting Heke's mother posthumously to Empress, Heke should have been promoted to that of a Princess of the First Rank, but she wasn't. She was the only Princess in the history of all Qing to be the biological daughter of an Empress who didn't get promoted to Princess of the First Rank.

She had one daughter who, married Rinchen Dorji (林沁多尔济).

Ancestry

References 

1758 births
1780 deaths
Qing dynasty princesses
18th-century Chinese women
18th-century Chinese people
Daughters of emperors
People from Beijing